Parchestan-e Owrak Shalu (also Romanized as Parchestān-e Owrak Shālū; also known as Barcheshtān, Barchistān, Parchestān, and Parchestān-e Adrak Shāh) is a village in Howmeh-ye Sharqi Rural District, in the Central District of Izeh County, Khuzestan Province, Iran. At the 2006 census, its population was 583, in 101 families.

References 

Populated places in Izeh County